Prof. Dr. M. Badiul Alam (born 28 February 1949) is a Bangladeshi academic who served as the 13th vice chancellor of the University of Chittagong.

Early life and career
Alam was born in Nolbila, Maheshkhali, Cox's Bazar in the then East Bengal. He earned his bachelor's, master's and PhD from the University of Dhaka, University of Waterloo and University of Delhi respectively. He served as the dean, head of the Department of Political Science at the University of Chittagong and president of Bangladesh Political Science Association.

References

Living people
1949 births
University of Dhaka alumni
University of Waterloo alumni
Delhi University alumni
Academic staff of the University of Chittagong
Vice-Chancellors of the University of Chittagong
People from Cox's Bazar District